Vernonia is a large, broadly distributed genus of flowering plants in the aster family, Asteraceae. , there are around 350 accepted species in Kew's Plants of the World Online.

References

L
Vernonia